202 (two hundred [and] two) is the natural number following 201 and preceding 203.

In mathematics 

202 is a Smith number, meaning that its digit sum and the sum of digits of its prime factors are equal. It is also a strobogrammatic number, meaning that when shown on a seven-segment display, turning the display upside-down shows the same number.

There are exactly 202 partitions of 32 (a power of two) into smaller powers of two. There are also 202 distinct (non-congruent) polygons that can be formed by connecting all eight vertices of a regular octagon into a cycle, and 202 distinct (non-isomorphic) directed graphs on four unlabeled vertices, not having any isolated vertices.

See also
 Area code 202, the area code assigned to Washington D.C.
 HTTP status code 202 meaning the request was accepted but has not yet been fulfilled
 List of highways numbered 202
 The Peugeot 202 automobile
 Potassium sorbate, a preservative whose E number is 202

References

Integers